Leasehold reform may refer to either of the following UK Acts of Parliament:

Leasehold Reform Act 1967
Commonhold and Leasehold Reform Act 2002
Leasehold Reform (Ground Rent) Act 2022